"Unholy Confessions" is a song by Avenged Sevenfold, released as the lead single from their second album, Waking the Fallen. It is the band's first official single after their 2001 debut EP release Warmness on the Soul, and was the first single by the band to receive mainstream exposure, being heavily rotated on MTV2's Headbangers Ball. The song is about two people, who are a couple, who find out they are both cheating on each other.

Background
"Unholy Confessions" was the first Avenged Sevenfold song to predominantly feature clean singing.

The song made its live debut on February 25, 2003, and has remained a permanent staple of the band's live set (though there have been a few occasions where it was omitted). As of June 2018, it has been performed live a total of 807 known times, and is Avenged Sevenfold's most played song live, ahead of the runner-up "Bat Country", which has been played a total of 730 times. It is also the only song from Waking the Fallen to have remained a staple of their live set.

Music videos
The band, along with director Thomas Mignone, filmed the song's concept video on December 7th 2003, featuring the band performing the single at an abandoned warehouse. After a few months, they posted on their website's blog about their discomfort with the video, and the decision to re-shoot the video. The concept video eventually got released on YouTube, along with the 2014 re-release of Waking the Fallen.

In February 2004, the band shared the plan to film the new video, which was this time a live performance. The video also features many fans filming at their homes getting ready for the show, whether by promoting, driving to the concert, among other things. The performance was shot on March 6, 2004, at the Henry Fonda Theatre.

Critical reception
"Unholy Confessions" is widely regarded as one of the band's best songs. In 2020, Louder Sound and Kerrang ranked the song at number six and number two, respectively, on their lists of the 20 greatest Avenged Sevenfold songs.

Track listing
12" single

DVDr

Promo single

Personnel
Credits are adapted from the album's liner notes.

Avenged Sevenfold

 M. Shadows – lead vocals
 Zacky Vengeance – guitars, backing vocals
 The Rev – drums, percussion, backing vocals
 Synyster Gates – guitars, piano, backing vocals
 Johnny Christ – bass guitar, backing vocals

Production
 Andrew Murdock – producer, mixing engineer
 Fred Archambault – co-producer
 Ai Fujisaki – assistant engineer
 Tom Baker – mastering engineer
 Mike Fasano, Bruce Jacoby, Al Pahanish – drum tech
 Stephen Ferrara – guitar tech
 Scott Gilman – orchestral arrangements and performance

Certifications

References

2003 songs
2004 debut singles
Avenged Sevenfold songs
Songs about infidelity